Vašek is both a Czech surname and masculine given name (diminutive of Václav). It may refer to:

Surname
Anton Vašek (1905–1946), Slovak Holocaust perpetrator
Petr Vašek (born 1979), Czech footballer
Radomír Vašek (born 1972), Czech tennis player

Given name
Vašek Klouda (born 1986), Czech freestyle footbag player
Vašek Svoboda (born 1990), Czech footballer
Vašek Pospíšil (born 1990), Canadian tennis player

Czech-language surnames
Czech masculine given names